Vince Jasper is a former professional football player who was an offensive lineman for the New York Jets during the 1987 season.

References

1964 births
American football offensive linemen
New York Jets players
Iowa State Cyclones football players
Living people
People from Hawarden, Iowa
Players of American football from Iowa
National Football League replacement players